Brian Gassaway (August 7, 1972 – October 17, 2021) was an American mixed martial artist who last competed in the Welterweight division. A professional competitor from 1996 until 2010, he competed for the UFC, Bellator, the WEC, King of the Cage, Shooto, and Pancrase.



Mixed martial arts record

|-
| Loss
| align=center| 29–20–2 (1)
| Shungo Oyama
| Technical Submission (inverted triangle choke) 
| MC: Martial Combat 10 
| 
| align=center| 1
| align=center| 1:50
| Sentosa, Singapore
| 
|-
| Win
| align=center| 29–19–2 (1)
| Kevin Knabjian
| Decision (unanimous)
| Bellator 25
| 
| align=center| 3
| align=center| 5:00
| Chicago, Illinois, United States
| 
|-
| Loss
| align=center| 28–19–2 (1)
| Mike Pyle
| Submission (armbar)
| SuperFights MMA: Night of Combat 2
| 
| align=center| 1
| align=center| 4:21
| Las Vegas, Nevada, United States
| 
|-
| Loss
| align=center| 28–18–2 (1)
| Forrest Petz
| Decision (unanimous)
| Adrenaline MMA: Guida vs. Russow
| 
| align=center| 3
| align=center| 5:00
| Chicago, Illinois, United States
| 
|-
| Win
| align=center| 28–17–2 (1)
| Jose Landi-Jons
| TKO (broken leg)
| TKO 32: Ultimatum
| 
| align=center| 2
| align=center| 0:50
| Montreal, Quebec, Canada
| 
|-
| Win
| align=center| 27–17–2 (1)
| Levi Avera
| Submission (armbar)
| ICS: Cage Rage
| 
| align=center| 1
| align=center| 4:55
| Oklahoma, United States
| 
|-
| Win
| align=center| 26–17–2 (1)
| Cedric Marks
| Decision (majority)
| CCCF: Riverwind Rumble 2
| 
| align=center| 5
| align=center| 3:00
| Oklahoma, United States
| 
|-
| Loss
| align=center| 25–17–2 (1)
| Dereck Keasley
| Decision (unanimous)
| KOTC: Damage Control
| 
| align=center| 2
| align=center| 5:00
| Chicago, Illinois, United States
| 
|-
| Loss
| align=center| 25–16–2 (1)
| John Alessio
| Submission (rear naked choke)
| WEC 25: Las Vegas
| 
| align=center| 1
| align=center| 4:50
| Nevada, United States
| 
|-
| Loss
| align=center| 25–15–2 (1)
| Donnie Liles
| Submission (rear naked choke)
| XFO 13: Operation Beatdown
| 
| align=center| 1
| align=center| 3:58
| Hoffman Estates, Illinois, United States
| 
|-
| Win
| align=center| 25–14–2 (1)
| Sam Jackson
| Submission (strikes)
| XFO 12: Outdoor War
| 
| align=center| 1
| align=center| 3:54
| Illinois, United States
| 
|-
| Win
| align=center| 24–14–2 (1)
| Jamie Toney
| Decision (unanimous)
| EC 68: Extreme Challenge 68
| 
| align=center| 3
| align=center| 5:00
| Hayward, Wisconsin, United States
| 
|-
| Loss
| align=center| 23–14–2 (1)
| Joey Clark
| Decision (unanimous)
| KOTC: Redemption on the River
| 
| align=center| 3
| align=center| 5:00
| Illinois, United States
| 
|-
| Loss
| align=center| 23–13–2 (1)
| Diego Sanchez
| TKO (submission to punches)
| UFC 54: Boiling Point
| 
| align=center| 2
| align=center| 1:56
| Nevada, United States
| 
|-
| Win
| align=center| 23–12–2 (1)
| Gia Chirragishvili
| Submission (rear-naked choke)
| Shido: MMA
| 
| align=center| 1
| align=center| 3:10
| Georgia, United States
| 
|-
| Win
| align=center| 22–12–2 (1)
| Trevor Garrett
| Submission (rear-naked choke)
| SB 40: SuperBrawl 40
| 
| align=center| 1
| align=center| 2:36
| Indiana, United States
| 
|-
| NC
| align=center| 21–12–2 (1)
| Ross Ebañez
| No Contest
|  WEC 14: Vengeance
| 
| align=center| N/A
| 
| California, United States
| 
|-
| Loss
| align=center| 21–12–2
| Nick Thompson
| Decision
| Combat: Do Fighting Challenge 2
| 
| align=center| N/A
| 
| Illinois, United States
| 
|-
| Win
| align=center| 21–11–2
| Paul Jenkins
| Decision
| CW: Cage Wars
| 
| align=center| N/A
| 
| Ireland
| 
|-
| Draw
| align=center| 20–11–2
| Gideon Ray
| Draw
| Shooto: Midwest Fighting
| 
| align=center| 3
| align=center| 5:00
| Indiana, United States
| 
|-
| Win
| align=center| 20–11–1
| Stephane Jamet
| align=center| N/A
| Shido: Fists of Fury 2
| 
| align=center| N/A
| 
| Germany
| 
|-
| Loss
| align=center| 19–11–1
| Tetsuji Kato
| Decision (unanimous)
| Shooto: 3/18 in Korakuen Hall
| 
| align=center| 3
| align=center| 5:00
| Tokyo, Japan
| 
|-
| Win
| align=center| 19–10–1
| Jason Rigsby
| Decision (unanimous decision)
| IC 5: Tribulation
| 
| align=center| 3
| align=center| 5:00
| Indiana, United States
| 
|-
| Loss
| align=center| 18–10–1
| Yuki Kondo
| Submission (toe hold)
| Pancrase: Proof 2
| 
| align=center| 1
| align=center| 1:45
| Osaka, Japan
| 
|-
| Loss
| align=center| 18–9–1
| Ikuhisa Minowa
| Submission (toe hold)
| Pancrase: 2000 Anniversary Show
| 
| align=center| 1
| align=center| 5:00
| Yokohama, Japan
| 
|-
| Win
| align=center| 18–8–1
| John Chrisostomo
| Decision (unanimous)
| Pancrase - Trans 5
| 
| align=center| 1
| align=center| 10:00
| Tokyo, Japan
| 
|-
| Win
| align=center| 17–8–1
| Yuji Hisamatsu
| Decision (majority)
| Pancrase: Trans 5
| 
| align=center| 2
| align=center| 3:00
| Tokyo, Japan
| 
|-
| Loss
| align=center| 16–8–1
| Adrian Serrano
| Decision (unanimous)
| EC 31: Extreme Challenge 31
| 
| align=center| 3
| align=center| 5:00
| Wisconsin, United States
| 
|-
| Win
| align=center| 16–7–1
| Henry Matamoros
| TKO
| TC: Total Combat 1
| 
| align=center| N/A
| 
| Illinois, United States
| 
|-
| Win
| align=center| 15–7–1
| Dan Griffen
| Submission
| TC: Total Combat 1
| 
| align=center| N/A
| 
| Illinois, United States
| 
|-
| Win
| align=center| 14–7–1
| Dennis Reed
| Submission (armbar)
| EC 26: Extreme Challenge 26
| 
| align=center| 1
| align=center| 3:30
| Illinois, United States
| 
|-
| Win
| align=center| 13–7–1
| Joshua Taibl
| Submission (rear-naked choke)
| CC 3: Cage Combat 3
| 
| align=center| 1
| align=center| 2:18
| Ohio, United States
| 
|-
| Win
| align=center| 12–7–1
| John Renken
| TKO
| CC 3: Cage Combat 3
| 
| align=center| 1
| align=center| 7:38
| Ohio, United States
| 
|-
| Win
| align=center| 11–7–1
| Travis Fulton
| Decision
| CC 3: Cage Combat 3
| 
| align=center| 1
| align=center| 15:00
| Ohio, United States
| 
|-
| Draw
| align=center| 10–7–1
| Kevin Cook
| Draw
| WEF 6: World Extreme Fighting 6
| 
| align=center| N/A
| 
| Florida, United States
| 
|-
| Win
| align=center| 10–7
| John Chrisostomo
| TKO (cut)
| SB 12: SuperBrawl 12
| 
| align=center| 2
| align=center| 0:32
| Hawaii, United States
| 
|-
| Win
| align=center| 9–7
| Adam Palmer
| TKO
| EB 4: Extreme Boxing 4
| 
| align=center| 1
| align=center| 5:51
| Iowa, United States
| 
|-
| Win
| align=center| 8–7
| Joe Slick
| Decision
| EB 4: Extreme Boxing 4
| 
| align=center| 1
| align=center| 15:00
| Iowa, United States
| 
|-
| Win
| align=center| 7–7
| Mark Hughes
| Decision (split)
| JKD: Challenge 3
| 
| align=center| 3
| align=center| 5:00
| Chicago, Illinois, United States
| 
|-
| Win
| align=center| 6–7
| Martin Wickline
| Submission
| WPC: Rage in the Cage
| 
| align=center| N/A
| 
| Indiana, United States
| 
|-
| Win
| align=center| 5–7
| Jeremy Morrison
| Submission (armbar)
| JKD: Challenge 1
| 
| align=center| 1
| align=center| 3:50
| Illinois, United States
| 
|-
| Win
| align=center| 4–7
| Jason Nicholsen
| Submission (armbar)
| WPC: World Pankration Championships 2
| 
| align=center| 1
| 
| Texas, United States
| 
|-
| Loss
| align=center| 3–7
| Vernon White
| Submission (ankle lock)
| WPC: World Pankration Championships 1
| 
| align=center| 1
| align=center| 1:26
| Texas, United States
| 
|-
| Loss
| align=center| 3–6
| Egidio da Costa
| Submission (headlock)
| International Vale Tudo Championship 2: A Question of Pride
| 
| align=center| 1
| align=center| 2:54
| Brazil
| 
|-
| Loss
| align=center| 3–5
| Osami Shibuya
| Submission
| Pancrase: Alive 7
| 
| align=center| 1
| align=center| 8:47
| Japan
| 
|-
| Loss
| align=center| 3–4
| Keiichiro Yamamiya
| Decision (lost points)
| Pancrase: Alive 1
| 
| align=center| 1
| align=center| 10:00
| Tokyo, Japan
| 
|-
| Loss
| align=center| 3–3
| Jay R. Palmer
| TKO (submission to punches)
| SB 2: SuperBrawl 2
| 
| align=center| 1
| align=center| 4:05
| Hawaii, United States
| 
|-
| Loss
| align=center| 3-2
| Mike Sciortino
| align=center| N/A
| IFC 3: International Fighting Championship 3
| 
| align=center| N/A
| 
| Alabama, United States
| 
|-
| Win
| align=center| 3–1
| Loren Phillips
| align=center| N/A
| IFC 3: International Fighting Championship 3
| 
| align=center| N/A
| 
| Alabama, United States
| 
|-
| Loss
| align=center| 2–1
| Anthony Macias
| Submission (kneebar)
| IFC 2: Mayhem in Mississippi
| 
| align=center| 1
| align=center| 1:28
| Mississippi, United States
| 
|-
| Win
| align=center| 2–0
| William Knorr
| Submission (rear-naked choke)
| IFC 2: Mayhem in Mississippi
| 
| align=center| 1
| align=center| 1:12
| Mississippi, United States
| 
|-
| Win
| align=center| 1–0
| Michael Pacholik
| Submission (rear-naked choke)
| IFC 2: Mayhem in Mississippi
| 
| align=center| 1
| align=center| 1:38
| Mississippi, United States
|

References

External links
Brian Gassaway—Official UFC profile

1972 births
2021 deaths
American male mixed martial artists
Mixed martial artists from Illinois
Welterweight mixed martial artists
Mixed martial artists utilizing Brazilian jiu-jitsu
American practitioners of Brazilian jiu-jitsu
Sportspeople from Chicago
Ultimate Fighting Championship male fighters